Cassiduloida is an order of sea urchins. The group was extremely diverse with many families and species during the Mesozoic, but today, only seven extant species remain.

A 2019 phylogenetic systematics study by Souto et al. presented a revised classification of the cassiduloids, and hypothesised that the order probably originated in the Early Cretaceous.

Description and characteristics 
Cassiduloids have a rounded or slightly oval appearance, and look somewhat similar to heart urchins, although they are actually more closely related to the sand dollars. They are distinguished from other sea urchins by the presence of smaller intervening areas between the main ambulacral areas on the oral surface. They have no lantern as adults, and the petaloids are poorly developed or absent.

List of families and genera 
 family Cassidulidae (L. Agassiz and Desor, 1847)
 genus Cassidulus (Lamarck, 1801)
 genus Paralampas (Duncan & Sladen, 1882)
 genus Rhyncholampas (Agassiz, 1869)
 family Eurhodiidae fam. nov.
 genus Australanthus (Bittner, 1892)
 genus Eurhodia (d'Archiac & Haime, 1853)
 genus Glossaster (Lambert, 1918)
 genus Kassandrina (Souto & Martins, 2018)
 family Faujasiidae (Lambert, 1905)
 family Neolampadidae (Lambert, 1918a)
 family Pliolampadidae (Kier, 1962) †

References 

 
 
 

 
Echinoderm orders